Cosmo Christopher Sheldrake is an English musician, composer, and producer. He is the son of parapsychologist Rupert Sheldrake and voice teacher Jill Purce, and the brother of biologist Merlin Sheldrake. He released his first single, "The Moss"/"Solar", in 2014 and followed it up with the Pelicans We EP in 2015.

Career
Described as a "musical visionary" by The Telegraph, Sheldrake has been releasing music since 2014.

His debut single, "The Moss", was released on 25 March 2014, followed by a debut EP, Pelicans We, on 6 April 2015, and a debut album, The Much Much How How and I, on 6 April 2018. His second album, Wake Up Calls was released on 18 September 2020.

Much of Sheldrake's work is concerned with improvisation, nonsense, and the sonorous environment. He has provided music for film and theatre, including the score for a series of Samuel Beckett plays at the Young Vic in London. Sheldrake also performs solo and with several bands including Johnny Flynn & The Sussex Wit and the Gentle Mystics. His song "Come Along" was featured in an advertisement for Apple's iPhone XR in the US and UK. The song subsequently charted at number 39 on the US Digital Songs chart dated 26 January 2019.

Sheldrake's single "No. 3", released in 2022, features in an advertisement for Apple, of the Mac Studio and Apple Studio Display.

Discography

Albums

EPs

Singles

References

External links
 

Living people
British multi-instrumentalists
1989 births